This is a partial list of automobile sales by model. Wherever possible, references to verify the claims have been included, however even figures given by manufacturers may have a degree of inaccuracy or hyperbole. Also note that a single vehicle can be sold concurrently under several nameplates in different markets, as with for example the Nissan Sunny; in such circumstances manufacturers often provide only cumulative sales figures for all models. As a result, there is no definitive standard for measuring sales.

Vehicles listed in italics are those who achieved their figures through sales of a single generation without any major redesign. The most common distinction is to refer to these specifically as the "bestselling vehicles", as opposed to "bestselling nameplates", where sales have been achieved through perpetuation of the brand name across several unrelated generations of automobiles.

The three vehicles most frequently cited as the bestselling automobiles in the world are the Toyota Corolla, Ford F-Series, and the Volkswagen Golf.

A

B

C

D

E

F

G

H

I

J

K

L

M

N

O

P

R

S

T

V

W

Y

Z

See also
 List of automobile manufacturers
 List of best-selling automobiles
 List of automotive superlatives
 List of modern production plug-in electric vehicles
 Ford bestselling models

References

Sales